Alexander Abramsky (22 January 1898 in Lutsk – 29 August 1985 in Moscow) was a Soviet composer. He was known for his adaptation of folk music within his compositions.

References

1898 births
1985 deaths
People from Lutsk
People from Lutsky Uyezd
Ukrainian Jews
Soviet classical composers